The 1989 Eastern Illinois Panthers football team represented Eastern Illinois University during the 1989 NCAA Division I-AA football season. The Panthers played their home games at O'Brien Stadium in Charleston, Illinois.

Schedule

References 

Eastern Illinois
Eastern Illinois Panthers football seasons
Eastern Illinois Panthers football